Pekka Tonteri (22 October 1880, Antrea – 23 September 1953) was a Finnish farmer and politician. He served as a Member of the Parliament of Finland from 1919 to 1919, representing the Social Democratic Party of Finland (SDP).

References

1880 births
1953 deaths
People from Kamennogorsk
People from Viipuri Province (Grand Duchy of Finland)
Social Democratic Party of Finland politicians
Members of the Parliament of Finland (1919–22)